The Sukhoi Su-7 (NATO designation name: Fitter-A) is a swept wing, supersonic fighter aircraft developed by the Soviet Union in 1955. Originally, it was designed as a tactical, low-level dogfighter, but was not successful in this role. On the other hand, the soon-introduced Su-7B series became the main Soviet fighter-bomber and ground-attack aircraft of the 1960s. The Su-7 was rugged in its simplicity, but its Lyulka AL-7 engine had such high fuel consumption that it seriously limited the aircraft's payload, as even short-range missions required that at least two hardpoints be used to carry drop tanks rather than ordnance.

Design and development

Original Su-7 fighters 
On 14 May 1953, after Joseph Stalin's death, the Sukhoi OKB was reopened and by the summer, it began work on a swept-wing front-line fighter. The first prototype, designated S-1, was designed to use the new Lyulka AL-7 turbojet engine. It was the first Soviet aircraft to utilize the all-moving tailplane and a translating centerbody, a movable inlet cone in the air intake for managing airflow to the engine at supersonic speeds. The aircraft also had a wing sweep of 60°, irreversible hydraulically boosted controls, and an ejection seat of Sukhoi’s own design.

The S-1 first flew on 7 September 1955 with A. G. Kochetkov at the controls. Fitted with an afterburning version of the AL-7 engine after the first eleven flights, the prototype set a Soviet speed record of 2,170 km/h (1,170 kn, 1,350 mph, Mach 2.04) in April 1956. The prototype was intended to be armed with three 37 mm Nudelman N-37 cannons and 32 spin-stabilized 57 mm (2.25 in) unguided rockets in a ventral tray. The second prototype, S-2, introduced some aerodynamic refinements. Testing was complicated by the unreliable engine, and S-1 was lost in a crash on 23 November 1956, killing its pilot I. N. Sokolov. Only 132 have been produced between 1957 and 1960, and the aircraft entered service as Su-7 in 1959.

Su-7B fighter-bomber 
On 31 July 1958, Soviet tactical aviation (Frontovaya Aviatsiya, фронтовая авиация) tasked Sukhoi with developing a ground-attack variant of the Su-7, which could replace the scrapped Ilyushin Il-40. The resulting prototype, S-22,  incorporated structural refinements for high-speed, low-altitude operations. It first flew in March 1959, and entered service in 1961 as the Su-7B.

Operationally, Su-7s were hampered by a high landing speed of 340–360 km/h, as dictated by the thin, highly-swept wing. Combined with poor visibility from the cockpit, and lack of an instrument landing system, it made operations very difficult, especially in poor weather or on poor airfields.  In 1961–1962, Sukhoi experimented with blown flaps on S-25 but the benefit was too small to warrant implementation. JATO rockets tested on S-22-4 proved more useful and were incorporated into the Su-7BKL. Attempts to improve takeoff and landing performance eventually resulted in the Sukhoi Su-17.

Su-7A fighter 
The front-line fighter version saw limited operational use in the Far East from 1958, but by 1959, a decision was made to proceed with production of the MiG-21, and less than 200 units were deployed. The Su-7A was retired in 1965.  They never saw combat.

Su-7B fighter-bomber 

The Su-7B and its variants became the main Soviet ground-attack aircraft of the 1960s. They were also widely exported (691 planes, including some trainers). However, the very short combat radius and need for long runways limited the Su-7's operational usefulness. On the other hand, despite its notoriously heavy controls, the Su-7 was popular with pilots for its docile flight characteristics, simple controls and considerable speed even at low altitudes. It also had a reputation for easy maintenance.

In 1977–1986 the Su-7s remaining in Soviet service were replaced by Su-17s and MiG-27s.

Operational history

Egypt

The Su-7 saw combat with Egypt in the 1967 Six-Day War, the subsequent War of Attrition, and saw use in the Yom Kippur War by the Egyptians to attack Israeli ground forces.

India

The Indian Air Force (IAF) used the Su-7 extensively in the 1971 war with Pakistan. Six squadrons, totaling 140 aircraft, flew almost 1,500 offensive sorties during the war, and undertook the bulk of the daytime attack missions. The IAF managed to retain a very high operational tempo with its Su-7s, peaking at a sortie rate of six per pilot per day.  Fourteen Su-7s were lost during the war, mostly due to anti-aircraft fire. After the war, it was found that the aircraft had high survivability, being able to fly home safely despite receiving heavy damage. For example, Wing Commander H. S. Mangat's Su-7 was badly damaged by a PL-2 missile fired by a Pakistan Air Force F-6. The impact was so severe that half the rudder was missing, the elevators, ailerons, and flaps were severely damaged, and half the missile was stuck in the chute pipe.   The pilot made it back to his base.
The death of at least one Indian pilot can be attributed, at least indirectly, to poor cockpit design. A pilot set his seating at a dangerous position "because he found the bombsight and the front gun sight easier to operate" while in that position, and was killed on ejection.

Indian Su-7BMKs shot down at least two Shenyang F-6s in the 1971 war, while losing three Su-7s to F-6s according to Pakistani sources.

Variants

A total of 1,847 Su-7 and its variants were built.

Su-7
First production version. The only production version that was a tactical air superiority fighter. Factory designation S-2. Manufactured 1957–1960 with 132 built. Remained in operational service until 1965.
Su-7B
The first ground-attack version, factory designation S-22. Manufactured 1960–1962 with 431 built.
Su-7BM
Upgraded AL-7F-1 engine, upgraded fuel system with external piping on either side of the fuselage spine, fuel tanks installed in the wings, "wet" underwing hardpoints for carrying external fuel tanks, capable of carrying tactical nuclear bombs. Manufactured 1963–1965 with 290 built.
Su-7BKL
Rough field-capable variant with skids fixed to the sides of the main landing gear, provision for two SPRD-110 JATO rockets of 29.4 kN (13,300 lbf) thrust, and twin brake parachutes. Introduced in 1965, factory designation S-22KL. Manufactured 1965–1972 with 267 built.
Su-7BMK
A simplified export version of the Su-7BM. Manufactured 1967–1971 with 441 built.
Su-7U (NATO Moujik)
Two-seat trainer version of the Su-7B with reduced fuel capacity. First flight 25 October 1965. Manufactured 1966–1972 in parallel with the export version, designated Su-7UMK.
Su-7UM (NATO Moujik)
Two-seat training version of the Su-7BM.
Su-7UMK (NATO Moujik)
Two-seat training version of the Su-7BMK. All Su-7 trainers amounted to 411 built.
Su-7IG
Experimental variable geometry wing aircraft which was developed into Sukhoi Su-17.
100LDU Control Configured Vehicle
A Su-7U modified with canards and a longitudinal stability augmentation system. It was designed as a testbed for a fly-by-wire system for the Sukhoi T-4. It was later used in 1973–1974 during the development of the Su-27's fly-by-wire system.

OKB-51 designations 
S-1
(Strelovidnoye [krylo] – swept wings) OKB-51 designation for the first prototype of the Su-7 / Su-9 family.
S-2
OKB-51 designation for the first production version of the Su-7.
S-22
OKB-51 designation for the Su-7B production aircraft.
S-22-2
OKB-51 designation for the prototype of the Su-7BM.
S-22M
OKB-51 designation for the Su-7BM production aircraft.
S-22KL
OKB-51 designation for the Su-7BKL production aircraft, incorporating the short field equipment tested on the S-22-4.
S-23
As a precursor to the S-22-4 tests, the S-23 was tested with a pure ski undercarriage and with skis on the main legs only
S-22-4
An S-22 tested with wheel / ski undercarriage, brake parachute and SPRD-110 JATO boosters for rough/unpaved field operations.
S-25
This aircraft was used for Boundary Layer Control (BLC) tests, with compressor bleed air blown over the leading edges to reduce takeoff length.
S-25T
A Su-7 fitted with the Boundary Layer Control system, rigged especially for use in a full-scale wind tunnel.
S-26
A continuation of the S-22-4 testing with wheel/ski undercarriage, double brake parachute and JATO boosters (The S-26 survives on display at the Russian Air Force Museum, Monino).
S-22MK
A simplified export version of the Su-7BKL, designated Su-7BMK
U-22
A belated trainer version with two seats in tandem in an extended nose based on the Su-7BM.
U-22MK
OKB-51 designation for the export version of the Su-7U, designated Su-7UMK by the Soviet Air Force
S-3
A projected interceptor version of the S-2, with "Izumrud" radar and avionic equipment in a reconfigured nose section.
S-41
OKB-51 designation for an experimental version of the S-1/S-2 with a lengthened nose and area-ruled rear fuselage.
T-1
A delta-wing tactical fighter project, based on the S-2, cancelled with the prototype nearly complete.
T-3
 A delta-winged interceptor version of the S-2, developed in parallel to the S-3 and T-1. This would eventually lead to the T-43 prototype of the Su-9 interceptor.

Operators

Current operators

North Korean Air Force – received at least 28 Su-7BMK/-7UMK in 1971. The aircraft were ordered in 1969.

Former operators

 Afghan Air Force – 24 Su-7BMK and 16 Su-7U trainers, were delivered to Afghanistan from 1972. Constant fighting, a high accident rate in the high altitude and poor maintenance caused substantial attrition. An additional 79 used replacements from Soviet stocks were supplied during the 1980s. None remain in service.

 Algerian Air Force – 40 Su-7BMK.

 Czechoslovak Air Force – the Czechoslovak Air Force was the first foreign operator of the Su-7 in 1963. Totals included 64 Su-7BM, 31 Su-7BKL and Su-7U. During operations service, 30 aircraft were lost in accidents. The remaining aircraft were phased out in 1990.

Egyptian Air Force – The first batch of 14 Su-7BMK was destroyed during the Six-Day War. From 1967–1972, Egypt received an additional 185 Su-7BMK/SU-7UMK. Those which survived the October War with Israel were retired in the mid-1980s.

Indian Air Force – 140 were delivered in 1968, equipping six squadrons. An additional 14 attrition replacements were provided. The last aircraft were retired in 1986.

Iraqi Air Force – The first contract for up to 34 Su-7BMK was signed in 1965, with deliveries starting in the spring of 1967. An additional order for 20 Su-7BMK was signed in July 1967. No longer in service.

Polish Air Force – operated 6 Su-7BM, 33 Su-7BKŁ and 8 Su-7U from July 1964 until June 1990; no longer in service.

Soviet Air Force

Syrian Air Force – Shortly after the Six-Day War of 1967, Syria received 25 Su-7s. In the October War of 1973, Syria lost most of the aircraft supplied. After 1973, The Soviet Union  resupplied Syria with 35 more aircraft. By the mid 1980s, the Su-7 had been transferred to the reserves, and by the 1990s were decommissioned.

Specifications (Su-7BKL)

See also

References

Notes

Citations

Bibliography

 
 Nijboer, Donald and Dan Patterson. Cockpits of the Cold War. Eden Prairie, Ontario: The Boston Mills Press, 2003. .
 
 
 Wheeler, Barry C. The Hamlyn Guide to Military Aircraft Markings. London: Chancellor Press, 1992. .

External links

 Su-7 from Global Security
 Su-7 from Global Aircraft
 Su-7 from Military Factory
 Su-7 BKL walkaround

Su-07
1960s Soviet attack aircraft
1950s Soviet fighter aircraft
Single-engined jet aircraft
Aircraft first flown in 1955
Mid-wing aircraft